Eliza Orzeszkowa (6 June 184118 May 1910) was a Polish novelist and a leading writer of the Positivism movement during foreign Partitions of Poland. In 1905, together with Henryk Sienkiewicz, she was nominated for the Nobel Prize in Literature.

Biography

She was born in Milkowszczyzna (then in the Russian Empire, now in Belarus) to a noble Pawłowski family, and died in Hrodna (now in Belarus) nearby. From 1852 to 1857, she lived in Warsaw, where she attended school. There she met another future Polish writer Maria Konopnicka. After returning to Milkowszczyzna, at the age of sixteen, Eliza married Piotr Orzeszko, a Polish nobleman twice her own age, who was exiled to Siberia after the January Uprising of 1863. They were legally separated in 1869. She married again in 1894, after a 30-year-long loving relationship with Stanisław Nahorski, who died a few years later. In 1866, she moved to Hrodna and turned novelist.

Orzeszkowa wrote a series of 30 novels and 120 powerful sketches, dramas and novellas, dealing with the social conditions of her occupied country. Her novel Eli Makower (1875) describes the relations between the Jews and the Polish nobility; and Meir Ezofowicz (1878), the conflict between Jewish orthodoxy and modern liberalism. In 1888 Orzeszkowa wrote two novels about the Niemen River (now part of Belarus): Cham (The Boor) focused on the life of fishermen; and her most famous novel, Nad Niemnem (On the Niemen)—often compared to Pan Tadeusz—dealing with the issues of Polish aristocracy against the backdrop of political and social order. Her study on patriotism and cosmopolitanism appeared in 1880. A uniform edition of her works was published in Warsaw between 1884 and 1888. 
Much of her output is available also in German translation.

In 1905, together with Henryk Sienkiewicz and Leo Tolstoy, Orzeszkowa was nominated for the Nobel Prize in Literature. The prize was awarded to Sienkiewicz. According to official records of the Nobel Prize committee, the idea of dividing the prize was rejected as an act of disparagement, and only the latter ended up as the laureate.

Selected works

References

Attribution:

External links
 
 
 
 Szlakiem Elizy Orzeszkowej

1842 births
1910 deaths
People from Hrodna District
People from Grodnensky Uyezd
Clan of Korwin
19th-century Polish novelists
20th-century Polish novelists
Polish essayists
Polish political writers
Polish Theosophists
Polish women novelists
Polish women essayists
19th-century Polish women writers
19th-century Polish writers
20th-century Polish women writers
20th-century Polish writers
19th-century essayists
20th-century essayists
Polish positivists